The GKD Evolution is a convertible sports car manufactured by British company GKD Sports Cars, based in Boughton Monchelsea, near Maidstone with workshops at Lenham.

History 
On February 27, 2005, GKD Sports Cars purchased the G27 chassis jigs, body moulds, patterns and drawings from Ginetta. 

A number of changes were introduced; to the front and rear aerodynamics, styling, torsional rigidity for the chassis, weight, and front suspension geometry. The driver seat was updated as well. 

The updated car, renamed the Evolution, was launched in 2006.

The Evolution has been changed to take BMW 3 Series E36/E46 parts since the Sierra became more difficult to source. The Evolution will take any BMW 4- or 6-cylinder engine.

Parts are also available to G27 owners wanting to upgrade earlier models.

Components
The car uses a donor pack from a BMW 3 Series. The donor pack includes, half-shafts, brakes, prop shaft, steering column and lower steering shaft and if required, engine and gearbox. The large engine bay helps accommodate most engines, including 2.0-litre Cosworth, BMW straight six and Rover V8. The chassis comes with BMW engine mounts already welded to it to ease fitment.

Fully built cars are also supplied to foreign markets, countering crash test requirements.  

The body shell is made from GRP fibreglass, with a bespoke chassis housing the engine and suspension.

Example cars
The Evolution can utilize most engines, the chart below indicates performance with a BMW E46 M3 with standard spec.

Awards and press comments 
The S1 Cosworth first production car was awarded car of the year 2006 from Which Kit Car magazine. This included winning 5 out of 7 categories in the competition.

"From the specification, the Evolution comes across as an out and out performance car which, of course, it is but it's also practical."

References

External links 
 GKD Sports Cars
 

Cars of England